The Zapatista Anthem is the anthem of the Zapatista Army of National Liberation (EZLN), a political group which launched a rebellion in the Mexican state of Chiapas on 1 January 1994. The   
music was taken from a Mexican Revolution  corrido "Carabina 30-30".

Lyrics

External links
 https://web.archive.org/web/20060103070956/http://www.ezln.org/himno_zapatista.htm
 https://web.archive.org/web/20050906125406/http://ila-bonn.de/ezln/ezlntepoz.htm
http://struggle.ws/mexico/ezln/anthem.html

North American anthems
Spanish-language songs
Zapatista Army of National Liberation
Anarchist songs